Paropsis atomaria is a common leaf beetle in the subfamily Chrysomelinae. The specific name, atomaria, translates to mean speckled or freckled. 
They occur along eastern Australia from Adelaide to Brisbane.  
P. atomaria produce two generations during the summer across most of its range  A female can produce 600 eggs and deposits them at the tip of a leaf or twig.  This species is one of a few of the paropsines that may become a pest of plantation trees.

Gallery

References

Chrysomelinae
Beetles of Australia
Insect pests of temperate forests
Taxa named by Guillaume-Antoine Olivier